Elamkulam is a village in Perinthalmanna taluk of Malappuram district in Kerala state.

Geography

Prominent People
Elamkulam is the birthplace of the famous Indian communist leader late E. M. S. Namboodiripad.

Transportation
Elamkulam village connects to other parts of India through Perinthalmanna town.  National highway No. 66 passes through Tirur and the northern stretch connects to Goa and Mumbai.  The southern stretch connects to Cochin and Trivandrum.   Highway No. 966 goes to Palakkad and Coimbatore.   The nearest airport is at Kozhikode.  The nearest railway station is at Cherukara.

References

mehfil group

External links

 Malappuram District website

Villages in Malappuram district
Populated waterside places in India
Perinthalmanna area